Manila hemp, also known as abacá, is a type of buff-colored fiber obtained from Musa textilis (a relative of edible bananas), which is likewise called Manila hemp as well as abacá. It is mostly used for pulping for a range of uses, including specialty papers. It was once used mainly to make Manila rope, but this is now of minor importance. Abacá is an exceptionally strong fibre, nowadays used for special papers like teabag tissue. It is also very expensive, priced several times higher than woodpulp. Manila envelopes and Manila paper take their name from this fibre.

It is not actually hemp but is named so because hemp was long a major source of fibre, and other fibres were sometimes named after it. The name refers to the capital of the Philippines, one of the main producers of Manila hemp. The hatmaking straw made from Manila hemp is called tagal or tagal straw.

Diversity 
The Philippines, especially the Bicol region in Luzon, has the most Manila hemp or abacá genotypes and cultivars. Genetic analysis using simple sequence repeats (SSR) markers revealed that the Philippines' abacá germplasm is genetically diverse.  Abaca genotypes in Luzon had higher genetic diversity than in the Visayas and Mindanao. Ninety-five (95) percent was attributed to molecular variance within the population, and only 5% of the molecular variance to variation among populations. Genetic analysis by Unweighted Pair Group Method with Arithmetic Mean (UPGMA) revealed several clusters irrespective of geographical origin.

Production process 
Unlike cotton and some other natural fibres like cotton Abacá plants require no pesticides, herbicides or irrigation. This allows mixed-species, organic plantations in areas which were monoculture oil palm plantations, and in deforested rainforest cut down for lumber. Growing abacá plants can reduce erosion, increase biodiversity and enrich the soil. This is accomplished by interplanting abacá with other plant species and by allowing discarded abacá leaves to decompose and return their nutrients to the soil.

Cultivation 
The Abacá plants are grown in Catanduanes in the Philippine highlands without the use of water or pesticides. The banana plant is harvested up to three times per year.

Processing

Dyeing and weaving

See also
International Year of Natural Fibres

References

External links

Abaca Plant (Musa textilis) - Manila Hemp

Musaceae
Fiber plants